Robert Uihlein Jr. (1916–1976) was a German-American heir, businessman, polo player and philanthropist.

Early life
Robert Uihlein Jr. was born on March 26, 1916, in Milwaukee, Wisconsin. His father was Robert Uihlein Sr. and his grandfather August Uihlein. His great-great uncle, August Krug, was the founder of the Joseph Schlitz Brewing Company.

Uihlein attended the Phillips Academy in Andover, Massachusetts, where he graduated in 1934. He received a Bachelor of Science from Harvard University in 1938, and a law degree from the University of Wisconsin Law School in 1941. He then attended the U.S. Brewers Academy and the Wallerstein Laboratories in New York.

Career
Uihlein joined the family business, Joseph Schlitz Brewing Company, full-time in the sales staff department, in 1942. He became vice president in 1945, vice president of sales in 1951, Executive Vice President in 1959, and company President in 1961. In 1967, he became chairman of the board of directors. He served on the board of directors of the United States Brewers' Association. He was one of the four leading men in the Milwaukee Brewers, Inc. along with Allan "Bud" Selig, Judge Robert C. Cannon and Edmund Fitzgerald to bring the Seattle Pilots baseball team to Milwaukee in April 1970.

Polo
As a polo player, Uihlein won the U.S. Open Polo Championship in 1951 and 1961. He also won several Sunshine League and Twenty Goal titles. He served as a Governor of the United States Polo Association from 1949 to 1953, and from 1955 to 1974. He co-founded the Milwaukee Polo Club. He was inducted into the Museum of Polo and Hall of Fame in Lake Worth, Florida on February 17, 2001.

Philanthropy
Uihlein supported the American Cancer Society, the National Business Committee for the Arts, and the New York Philharmonic.

Death and legacy
Uihlein died from complications of leukemia on November 12, 1976. His grandsons, Robin and James Uihlein, play polo at the Sarasota Polo Club in Sarasota, Florida. His family owns the Schroeder-Manatee Ranch, which comprises Lakewood Ranch, Florida, the Sarasota Polo Club, and the Lakewood Ranch Golf & Country Club.

References

1916 births
1976 deaths
American people of German descent
Businesspeople from Milwaukee
Phillips Academy alumni
Harvard University alumni
University of Wisconsin Law School alumni
American polo players
20th-century American businesspeople
Uihlein Family